Raymond Reardon  (born 8 October 1932) is a Welsh retired professional snooker player. He turned professional in 1967 aged 35 and dominated the sport in the 1970s, winning the World Snooker Championship six times and more than a dozen other tournaments. Reardon was World Champion in 1970, 1973, 1974, 1975, 1976 and 1978, and runner-up in 1982. He won the inaugural Pot Black tournament in 1969, the 1976 Masters and the 1982 Professional Players Tournament.

Reardon was the first player to be ranked "world number one" when world rankings were introduced during the 1976–77 season, a position that he held for the next five years. He regained the top-ranking position in 1982, after which his form declined and he dropped out of the elite top-16 ranked players after the 1986–87 season. He remained one of snooker's top players into his 50s, setting several records. In 1978, Reardon became the oldest world snooker champion, aged 45 years and 203 days, a record that lasted until 2022 when Ronnie O'Sullivan won the title aged 46 years and 148 days. Reardon also became the oldest player to win a ranking event, which he accomplished in 1982, aged 50 years and 14 days. He never achieved a maximum break in tournament play; his highest  in competition was 146. Reardon retired from professional competition in 1991.

Reardon mentored O'Sullivan in preparation for his 2004 World Championship campaign, helping him lift his second world title. Before turning professional in 1978, Steve Davis was inspired to emulate certain aspects of Reardon's playing style that he felt would improve his own game. Reardon's dark widow's peak and prominent eye teeth earned him the nickname "Dracula". He is the president of Churston golf club in Devon, where he has been a member for over 40 years. Reardon was appointed a Member of the Order of the British Empire in 1985.

Early life
Reardon was born on 8 October 1932, in the coal mining community of Tredegar in Monmouthshire, Wales. When eight years old, he was introduced to a version of snooker by his uncle, and at ten he was practising cue sports twice-weekly at Tredegar Workmen's Institute as well as on a scaled-down billiard table at home. At the age of 14, following in the footsteps of his father, Reardon turned down a place at a grammar school to become a miner at Ty Trist Colliery. He wore white gloves while mining, to protect his hands for snooker.

In March 1959, Reardon married Sue, a pottery painter. After a rockfall in which he was buried for three hours, and with Sue's encouragement, he quit mining and became a police officer in 1960 when his family moved to Stoke-on-Trent in Staffordshire, England.

Amateur snooker career
In 1949, Reardon won the News of the World Amateur title and was awarded an ash cue stick, presented to him by 15-time world snooker champion, Joe Davis. Reardon used this cue for almost 30 years until it came apart shortly after the 1978 World Championship final. He reached the final of the 1949–50 under-19 Junior championship, losing 2–3 to Jack Carney. Reardon first won the Welsh Amateur Championship in 1950, defeating the defending champion John Ford 5–3 in the final, and he retained the title every year until 1955.

Their contests attracted hundreds of spectators and in his 1979 book, The Story of Billiards and Snooker, Clive Everton describes them as "modern snooker's nearest equivalent to a bare knuckle prize fight."

After losing in the first round of the 1957 English Amateur Championship, Reardon decided to take some time out from competitive snooker to work on improving his game. He next entered the championship in 1964, when he won the title by defeating John Spencer 11–8 in the final. This victory led to an invitation to tour South Africa with Jonathan Barron, which proved so successful that Reardon was offered the opportunity to return and tour again as a professional. Based on this offer, he resigned from the police force and turned professional in 1967.

Professional career

Six times world snooker champion
Reardon's first appearance at the World Snooker Championship was in 1969 in a quarter-final against Fred Davis in Stoke-on-Trent. The match featured lengthy tactical exchanges between the players, resulting in some of the longest sessions ever recorded in World Championship play. Neither player was ahead by more than two  until Reardon won the 27th frame to lead 15–12, after which Davis won six frames in a row. In July 1969, the BBC began broadcasting Pot Black, a competition of one-frame matches which became popular with viewers and enhanced the profile and earning power of the participants. Reardon won the first series by defeating Spencer 88–29 in the one-frame final.

In London in April 1970, Reardon won the World Championship for the first time, defeating Davis in the quarter-finals, Spencer in the semi-finals, and John Pulman 37–33 in the final, having led 27–14 before Pulman reduced the lead to one frame at 34–33. At the next World Championship, played in Australia in November 1970, Reardon won all four of his round-robin group matches, and qualified for a place in the semi-finals, where Spencer established a winning margin against him at 25–7 and finished the match 34–15 ahead after . Reardon won the October 1971 edition of the Park Drive 2000, defeating Spencer 4–3 in the final after placing second in the round-robin stage (behind Spencer who had placed first). In the Spring 1972 edition, he made a break of 146 in the round-robin, which was the highest-ever break in competitive play at that time. This remained the highest official break of Reardon's career, as he never achieved a maximum break of 147 in tournament play.

At the 1972 World Championship, Reardon lost his first match 22–25 to Rex Williams in the quarter-finals. He reached the final of the 1973 World Championship in Manchester, beating Jim Meadowcroft 16–10, and Spencer 23–22. He lost the first seven frames of the final to Eddie Charlton, but took 17 of the next 23 to hold a four-frame advantage at 17–13 and then moved further ahead into a 27–25 lead. Reardon was ahead 31–29 going into the last day, and won 38–32 to claim his second world title.

Reardon defended his World Championship title in 1974, defeating Meadowcroft 15–3, Marcus Owen 15–11 and Davis 15–3 before beating Graham Miles 22–12 in the final. In a post-match interview, Reardon suggested that he had not played "any better than mediocre" in the final, but that Miles had not created any pressure for him, adding: "I don't feel the elation that I felt at winning last year." He also won the 1974 Pontins Professional, leading 9–4 in the final and winning it 10–9 after Spencer took five consecutive frames to force a decider.

At the 1975 World Championship in Australia, he won a tough quarter-final against Spencer, 19–17, and then eliminated Alex Higgins 19–14 in the semi-finals to meet Charlton in the final. Reardon was leading 16–8, but Charlton won the following nine frames and then went ahead 28–23 before Reardon pulled back seven of the next eight frames to lead 30–29. Charlton took the 60th frame to tie the match but Reardon won the vital 61st frame to secure the world title for the third successive year. A week later, at Pontins in Prestatyn, Wales, he retained the Professional title and won the Spring Open title.

Reardon won the Masters in January 1976, beating Miles 7–3 in the final. He had earned his place in the final by defeating Pulman 4–1 in the quarter-finals, in a match where the highest break (compiled by Pulman) was only 22, and then Charlton 5–4 in the semi-finals.

In 1976 Reardon won his fifth world title, defeating John Dunning 15–7, Dennis Taylor 15–2 and Perrie Mans 20–10. During the final in Manchester against Higgins, Reardon complained about the television lighting (which was changed), the quality of the table (to which adjustments were subsequently made), and the referee (who was replaced). Higgins led in the early stages of the match, but Reardon recovered to 15–13 before winning 12 of the next 15 frames for a 27–16 victory. He claimed the Pontins Professional title for the third consecutive year, defeating Fred Davis 10–9 in a contest described by Snooker Scene correspondent as the best match of the professional season for "quality, interest and excitement". Both players made a century break in the match, Reardon pulling ahead to 8–5 after losing all of the first three frames, but then needing the last two when Davis took the score to 9–8. Reardon also won the 1976 World Professional Match-play Championship in Australia, defeating the event's promoter Charlton 31–24 in the final.

Reardon reached the final of the 1977 Masters, beating Williams 4–1 in the quarter-finals and Miles 5–2 in the semi-finals, but lost the final 6–7 to Doug Mountjoy. He was also runner-up at the 1977 Benson & Hedges Ireland Tournament, losing 2–5 to Higgins. Reardon's successful run at the World Championship ended in 1977 at the Crucible Theatre in Sheffield, when he lost to Spencer in the quarter-finals 6–13; it was his first defeat at the World Championship since his quarter-final loss to Williams in 1972.

Reardon regained the world title in 1978 in Sheffield; after recovering from 2–7 down to beat Mountjoy 13–9 in the last-16 round, he defeated Bill Werbeniuk 13–6, Charlton 18–14, and Mans 25–18 in the final to lift the trophy for the sixth and final time. Aged 45 years and 203 days, Reardon was the oldest winner of the World Snooker Championship, a record that lasted until 2022 when Ronnie O'Sullivan won the title aged 46 years and 148 days. Soon after establishing this record, Reardon regained the Pontins Professional title, taking it for the fourth time in five years, defeating Spencer 7–2 in the final. The same year, his old rival from Tredegar, Wilson, won the World Amateur Championship.

Later professional career 
Toward the end of 1978, Reardon beat Patsy Fagan 6–1 and Higgins 11–9 to win the one-off "Champion of Champions" event, sponsored by the Daily Mirror and held at the Wembley Conference Centre. He also won the 1979 Forward Chemicals Tournament.

Reardon regained his Pot Black title in 1979 by defeating Mountjoy 2–1 in the final. This was Reardon's first win since he won the inaugural event in 1969, although he was runner-up in 1970, 1972 and 1980. At the 1979 World Championship, he lost to Dennis Taylor in the quarter-finals, and was eliminated by David Taylor at the same stage in 1980. He progressed one stage further in 1981, beating Spencer 13–11 and Werbeniuk 13–10 before being defeated by Mountjoy in the semi-finals. Mountjoy scored a championship record break of 145 during the match, which he won 16–10.

In 1979, Reardon joined with Mountjoy and the reigning World Champion, Terry Griffiths, to win the first World Challenge Cup for Wales, defeating England (Fred Davis, Spencer and Miles) in the final, 14–3. The same Wales team retained the title in 1980.

At the 1982 Highland Masters, Reardon eliminated Steve Davis in the semi-finals before winning the event by defeating Spencer 11–4 in the final.He reached the final of the 1982 World Championship, losing to Higgins 15–18. En route to the final, he defeated Jim Donnelly 10–5, John Virgo 13–8, Silvino Francisco 13–8, and Charlton, in the semi-finals, by 16–11 after winning five successive frames from 11-all. In the final, Reardon built a 5–3 lead, but was behind 7–10 at the end of the first day. He later levelled the match at 15–15, but Higgins won the last three frames to claim the title.

For the 1982–83 season, Reardon returned to number one in the world rankings, which at the time was only based on performances at the World Championships over previous years. He won the Professional Players Tournament in late 1982, beating Jimmy White 10–5 in the final, reached the final of the Benson & Hedges Masters, losing 7–9 to Cliff Thorburn, and won the 1983 International Masters, where he defeated Davis 2–1 in the semi-final group stages, before prevailing 9–6 against White in the final, having trailed 3–5. At the Professional Players Tournament, Reardon set a record as the oldest winner of a ranking tournament at the age of 50 years and 14 days. He also regained the Welsh Professional Title, eliminating Griffiths 9–4 and Mountjoy 9–1 in the semi-final and final respectively. At the 1983 World Championship, he lost 12–13 in the second round to Tony Knowles; he reached the quarter-finals in 1984 but was eliminated 2–13 by Kirk Stevens.

Reardon first wore spectacles in a match at the 1985 British Open, which he lost 4–5 to Dave Martin after leading 4–1. He reached the semi-finals of the 1985 World Championship (playing with unassisted vision), where he lost 5–16 to Davis.  He lost to John Campbell in the first round of the 1986 World Championship, and to Davis in the second round in 1987.

After dropping out of the top-16 rankings in 1987, Reardon whitewashed Davis 5–0 in the third round of the 1988 British Open, using his old cue (encouraged to rebuild it by Davis) with which he had won his world titles. In the next round, playing under TV lighting, he suffered a drying of contact lenses (which he started using in 1987) and lost 2–5 to David Roe, having led 2–1.

In 1985, Reardon left his wife Sue, with whom he had two children, to live with Carol Covington. He told reporters from the Daily Mirror that Sue had been "fully informed" of his eight-year affair with Covington. The Reardons divorced in December 1986, and Reardon married Covington in June 1987.

Retirement and legacy
Reardon played his last competitive ranking match in the second round of qualifying for the 1991 World Championship, where he was defeated 5–10 by Jason Prince, losing three frames on the final black. Afterwards, Reardon said that he felt "no bitterness" but that he would not be returning. Aged 58 and having slipped to 127th in the provisional rankings, Reardon halted his playing career, mentioning that he had not entered any tournaments for the following season because the qualifying event dates clashed with his exhibition commitments on the holiday camp circuit, but adding that "even if it were feasible, [he] wouldn't play" except in invitation or seniors events. He later played in the 2000 World Seniors Masters where he lost his opening one-frame match 46–69 to Miles. He advised Ronnie O'Sullivan on the way to his 2004 World Championship victory, giving him psychological and tactical help.

When the snooker world rankings were introduced in 1976, Reardon was the first to claim the position of world number one, retaining it until 1981. His win in the 1982 Professional Players Tournament at 50 contributed to his recapturing the world number one position in the first set of rankings to be calculated on tournaments other than the World Championship. Reardon and Spencer were the first players to exploit the commercial opportunities made available by the increasing interest in snooker in the early 1970s. After winning Pot Black in 1969 and the world title in 1970, Reardon took up offers for exhibition matches and holiday camp exhibition engagements. Everton and Gordon Burn (1986) have both noted that his peak as a player pre-dated the real boom in snooker that happened in the 1980s.

In January 1976, Reardon was the subject of an episode of the British TV show, This is Your Life, the guests including Spencer, Charlton, Higgins, Pulman, Miles, Thorburn, Jackie Rea and Joyce Gardner. Later that year, he was a guest on The David Nixon Show, and in 1979 he was a guest on Parkinson, A Question of Sport, and The Paul Daniels Magic Show. His later guest appearances included Punchlines (1981), Saturday Superstore (1984), The Rod and Emu Show (1984), Sorry! (1985), and The Little and Large Show (1987). He appeared on the snooker-themed game show Big Break several times. Ian Wooldridge wrote and presented a Ray Reardon special on BBC2 in 1984, and the same channel broadcast Ray Reardon at 80 in 2012. Reardon was a castaway on BBC Radio 4's Desert Island Discs in 1979, and chose a set of golf clubs and balls as his luxury item.

His prominent eye teeth and widow's peak led to him being nicknamed "Dracula"; the sobriquet was first used by Paul Daniels after Reardon appeared on one of his television shows. Everton has described Reardon in his early career as a "deadly long potter", and praised his "nerve with which he identifies and seizes frame winning openings." Jack Karnehm wrote that Reardon achieved "complete and utter dominance of the game" by 1976, and "had a determination and will to win unequalled since the heyday of Joe Davis." Williams and Gadsby describe Reardon as "without doubt the most successful snooker player of the 1970s" and claim "he set new standards for mental fortitude" in the game.

After seeing Reardon play at Pontins in 1975, Steve Davis incorporated elements that he had observed in Reardon's game into his own, including a pause before hitting the cue ball, and his "approach" to the shot. Burn wrote "Ray Reardon behaved as if he thought he was special. And Stevewith a little encouragement from [his manager] Barry [Hearn]decided that was how he was going to behave from now on." Unsettled by what he felt might be gamesmanship on Reardon's part, Davis had lost the match 0–4. Spencer stated in his autobiography that he was never friendly with Reardon, and suggested that he was "the sort of person who could laugh 24 hours a day if it was to his advantage".

Reardon was appointed a Member of the Order of the British Empire (MBE) in the 1985 Birthday Honours for services to snooker. He resides in Devon, and is the president of the golf club in Churston, a position that he has held since at least 2004, having been a member since the 1970s.  He made a playing appearance at a Snooker Legends evening in Plymouth in July 2010. The Welsh Open trophy was renamed the Ray Reardon Trophy in his honour, starting with the 2017 edition of the tournament.

Performance and rankings timeline

Career finals
Sources for the ranking and non-ranking final results can be found in the Performance timeline section above.

Ranking finals: 6 (5 titles)

Non-ranking finals: 44 (19 titles)

Team finals: 6 (3 titles)

Pro-am finals: 3 (1 title)

Amateur finals: 8 (7 titles)

Publications

Notes

References

Bibliography

External links
World Snooker profile of Ray Reardon

1932 births
Officers in English police forces
Living people
Sportspeople from Tredegar
Welsh people of Irish descent
Welsh police officers
Welsh snooker players
Masters (snooker) champions
World number one snooker players
People from Brixham
Members of the Order of the British Empire
Winners of the professional snooker world championship